Babu Kohyabhai Suthar is a Gujarati writer, linguist, journalist and academic from United States. Born and educated in India, he was a lecturer in South Asia Studies at the University of Pennsylvania in 2003, at the time the only full-time instructor in this language in North America at the university level.

As a linguist, he is primarily interested in South Asian Linguistics and Typological Linguistics and has completed PhD on Agreement in Gujarati at the Maharaja Sayajirao University of Baroda, under Bharati Modi. He had stint as journalist with the Gujarati newspaper Sandesh prior to taking up full-time academic pursuits.

He has written on linguistic philosophy as well as on literary theories in Gujarati, including a recently published co-authored piece on Gujarati language in Indo-Aryan Languages (RoutledgeCurzon, 2003). With his roots in Panchamahals district of Gujarat he has done several studies on the post-modern nuances of Gujarati idiom at his home territory.

He has also prepared extensive language materials: three textbooks, one learner's dictionary as well as several other materials for teaching Gujarati, including Gujarati thematic vocabulary, pedagogic grammar and Parts of Speech. 

Suthar has published four experimental novels called Kachando ane Darpan, Shrimad Kagadapachchisi, Vakyakatha and Valgad, and the fifth, Nidraviyoga, is in press.

He has a published poem collection Gurujaapa, while a second Sapphera is in press. His short stories Dhuliyo and Lulo have been translated in English. He has also written a long fairy tale for children, Ek Hato Chhokaro, commissioned by the Ministry of Culture in India.

He was an editor of Sandhi, a Gujarati quarterly.

See also
 List of Gujarati-language writers

References

External links
Gujarati Language and Literature
Babu Suthar's Gujarati-English Dictionary 

Linguists from the United States
American people of Gujarati descent
American Hindus
Living people
Gujarati people
Poets from Gujarat
Gujarati-language writers
Gujarati-language poets
Year of birth missing (living people)
Maharaja Sayajirao University of Baroda alumni